The 1969 California Golden Bears football team was an American football team that represented the University of California, Berkeley in the Pacific-8 Conference (Pac-8) during the 1969 NCAA University Division football season. In their sixth year under head coach Ray Willsey, the Golden Bears compiled a 5–5 record (2–4 against Pac-8 opponents), finished in sixth place in the Pac-8, and were outscored by their opponents by a combined total of 182 to 180.

The team's statistical leaders included Dave Penhall with 874 passing yards, Gary Fowler with 741 rushing yards, and Jim Fraser with 335 receiving yards.

Schedule

References

California
California Golden Bears football seasons
California Golden Bears football